"When a Woman's Fed Up" is an R&B song by American singer R. Kelly from his 1998 double album, R. The song reached number 22 on the Billboard Hot 100 and number 5 on the Hot R&B/Hip-Hop Singles chart. The video, directed by Kelly, features Kelly's protégée Sparkle as the woman who is fed up. The single and the video were released after Sparkle's debut single "Be Careful", a duet with R. Kelly, as a continuation of the story.

Music video
The music video is directed by R. Kelly. The video was released after Sparkle's debut single "Be Careful" with Kelly and it is seen as a continued story to that video. This and "Be Careful" are two of Kelly's first solo-directed videos since "She's Got That Vibe" from Kelly's then-group Public Announcement in 1991, as he usually co-directs with others.

Charts

Legacy

Later samples
"K-I-S-S-I-N-G" by Nas from the album I Am... (1999)
"Um Pouco Mais De Malandragem" by Facção Central from the album Família Facção (1999)
"America" by Trick Daddy feat. Society from the album Book of Thugs (2000)
"Runnin' Out of Bud" by 8Ball & MJG feat. Killer Mike from the album Ridin' High (2007)
"Thug Nigga" by Z-Ro from the album Heroin (2010)
"Broken Man" by Anthony Hamilton from the album Back to Love (2011)
"Thug and a Gee" by Prodeje from the album Hood 2 Da Good (2011)
"Smoke Break" by Lil B from the album 855 Song Based Freestyle Mixtape (2011)
"Smoke Break Pt1 Based Freestyle" by Lil B from the album 848 Song Based Freestyle Mixtape (2011)
"Neon Cathedral" by Macklemore and Ryan Lewis feat. Allen Stone from the album The Heist (2012)

Later covers
"Singing Melody" by Singing Melody from the album Total Togetherness Vol. 10 (1999)

References

R. Kelly songs
Songs written by R. Kelly
Song recordings produced by R. Kelly
1998 singles
1998 songs
Jive Records singles